Suzerainty is the rights and obligations of a person, state or other polity who controls the foreign policy and relations of a tributary state, while allowing the tributary state to have internal autonomy. While the subordinate party is called a vassal, vassal state or tributary state, the dominant party is called a suzerain. While the rights and obligations of a vassal are called vassalage, the rights and obligations of a suzerain are called suzerainty.

Suzerainty differs from sovereignty in that the dominant power allows tributary states to be technically independent, but enjoy only limited self-rule. Although the situation has existed in a number of historical empires, it is considered difficult to reconcile with 20th- or 21st-century concepts of international law, in which sovereignty is a binary concept, which either exists or does not. While a sovereign state can agree by treaty to become a protectorate of a stronger power, modern international law does not recognise any way of making this relationship compulsory on the weaker power. Suzerainty is a practical, de facto situation, rather than a legal, de jure one.

Imperial China

The tributary system of China or Cefeng system was a network of loose international relations focused on China which facilitated trade and foreign relations by acknowledging China's predominant role in East Asia. It involved multiple relationships of trade, military force, diplomacy and ritual. The other states had to send a tributary envoy to China on schedule, who would kowtow to the Chinese emperor as a form of tribute, and acknowledge his superiority and precedence. The other countries followed China's formal ritual in order to keep the peace with the more powerful neighbor and be eligible for diplomatic or military help under certain conditions. Political actors within the tributary system were largely autonomous and in almost all cases virtually independent.

The term "tribute system" as applied to China is technically a Western invention. There was no equivalent term in the Chinese lexicon to describe what would be considered the "tribute system" today, nor was it envisioned as an institution or system. John King Fairbank and Teng Ssu-yu created the "tribute system" theory in a series of articles in the early 1940s to describe "a set of ideas and practices developed and perpetuated by the rulers of China over many centuries." The Fairbank model presents the tribute system as an extension of the hierarchic and nonegalitarian Confucian social order. The more Confucian the actors, the more likely they were to participate in the tributary system.

In practice the behaviours collectively seen as a tributary system, which involved tribute and gift exchange in return for symbolic subordination, wereonly formalized during the early years of the Ming dynasty. Tributary members were virtually autonomous and carried out their own agendas despite sending tribute; as was the case with Japan, Korea, Ryukyu, and Vietnam. Chinese influence on tributary states was almost always non-interventionist in nature and tributary states "normally could expect no military assistance from Chinese armies should they be invaded".

The Chinese tributary system was upended in the 19th and 20th centuries as a result of Western and Japanese colonialism. Japan took Korea and the Ryukyu Islands, France took Vietnam, and Britain took Upper Burma.

Since the colonial times, Britain had regarded Tibet as being under Chinese suzerainty, but in 2008 the British Foreign Secretary David Miliband called that word an "anachronism" in a statement, and recognized Tibet as part of China.

Ancient Israel and Near East
Suzerainty treaties and similar covenants and agreements between Middle Eastern states were quite prevalent during the pre-monarchic and monarchy periods in Ancient Israel. The Hittites, Egyptians, and Assyrians had been suzerains to the Israelites and other tribal kingdoms of the Levant from 1200 to 600 BC. The structure of Jewish covenant law was similar to the Hittite form of suzerain.

Each treaty would typically begin with an "Identification" of the Suzerain, followed by an historical prologue cataloguing the relationship between the two groups "with emphasis on the benevolent actions of the suzerain towards the vassal". Following the historical prologue came the stipulation. This included tributes, obligations and other forms of subordination that would be imposed on the Israelites. According to the Hittite form, after the stipulations were offered to the vassal, it was necessary to include a request to have copies of the treaty that would be read throughout the kingdom periodically. The treaty would have divine and earthly witnesses purporting the treaty's validity, trustworthiness, and efficacy. This also tied into the blessings that would come from following the treaty and the curses from breaching it. For disobedience, curses would be given to those who had not remained steadfast in carrying out the stipulations of the treaty.

Hittite suzerainty treaty form
Below is a form of a Hittite suzerainty treaty.
 Preamble: Identifies the parties involved in the treaty, the author, the title of the sovereign party, and usually his genealogy. It usually emphasises the greatness of the king or dominant party.
 Prologue: Lists the deeds already performed by the Suzerain on behalf of the vassal. This section would outline the previous relationship the two groups had up until that point with historical detail and facts that are very beneficial to scholars today, such as scholar George Mendenhall who focuses on this type of covenant as it pertained to the Israelite traditions. The suzerain would document previous events in which they did a favor that benefitted the vassal. The purpose of this would show that the more powerful group was merciful and giving, therefore, the vassal should obey the stipulations that are presented in the treaty. It discusses the relationship between them as a personal relationship instead of a solely political one. Most importantly in this section, the vassal is agreeing to future obedience for the benefits that he received in the past without deserving them.
 Stipulations: Terms to be upheld by the vassal for the life of the treaty; defines how the vassal is obligated and gives more of the legalities associated with the covenant.
 Provision for annual public reading: A copy of the treaty was to be read aloud annually in the vassal state for the purpose of renewal and to inform the public of the expectations involved and increase respect for the sovereign party, usually the king.
 Divine witness to the treaty: These usually include the deities of both the Suzerain and the vassal, but put special emphasis on the deities of the vassal.
 Blessings if the stipulations of the treaty were upheld and curses if the stipulations were not upheld. These blessings and curses were generally seen to come from the gods instead of punishment by the dominant party for example.
 Sacrificial Meal: Both parties would share a meal to show their participation in the treaty.

India

British paramountcy

The British East India Company conquered Bengal in 1757, and gradually extended its control over the whole of India. It annexed many of the erstwhile Indian kingdoms (hereafter "states") but entered into alliances with the others. Some states were created by the East India Company itself through the grant of jagirs to influential allies. The states varied enormously in size and influence, with Hyderabad at the upper end with 16.5 million people and an annual revenue of 100 million rupees and states like Babri at the lower end with a population of 27 people and annual revenue of 80 rupees.

The principle was asserted in a letter by Lord Reading to the Nizam of Hyderabad in 1926, "The sovereignty of the British Crown is supreme in India and therefore no ruler of an Indian State can justifiably claim to negotiate with the British Government on an equal footing." This meant that the Indian states were Crown dependencies or protectorates of the British Indian government. They could not make war or have any direct dealings with foreign states. Neither did they enjoy full internal autonomy. The British government could and did interfere in their internal affairs if the imperial interests were involved or if it proved necessary in the interest of "so stated" good governance. In some cases, the British government also deposed the Indian princes.

Bose and Jalal say that the system of Paramountcy was a system of limited sovereignty only in appearance. In reality, it was a system of recruitment of a reliable base of support for the Imperial State. The support of the Imperial State obviated the need for the rulers to seek legitimacy through patronage and dialogue with their populations. Through their direct as well as indirect rule through the princes, the colonial State turned the population of India into 'subjects' rather than citizens.

The Government of India Act 1935 envisaged that India would be a federation of autonomous provinces balanced by Indian princely states. This plan never came to fruition. The political conditions were oppressive in several princely states giving rise to political movements. Under pressure from Mahatma Gandhi, the Indian National Congress resolved not to interfere directly but called on the princes to increase civil liberties and reduce their own privileges.

With the impending independence of India in 1947, the Governor-General Lord Mountbatten announced that the British paramountcy over the Indian states would come to an end. The states were advised to 'accede' to one of the new Dominions, India and Pakistan. An Instrument of Accession was devised for this purpose. The Congress leaders agreed to the plan with the condition that Mountbatten ensure that the majority of the states within the Indian territory accede to India. Under pressure from the Governor-General, all the Indian states acceded to India save two, Junagadh and Hyderabad. The two states acceded later, under coercion from India. Jammu and Kashmir, which shared a border with India as well as Pakistan, acceded to India when a Pakistan-backed invasion threatened its survival.

Sikkim
Following the independence of India in 1947, a treaty signed between the Chogyal of Sikkim Palden Thondup Namgyal, and the Prime Minister of India Jawaharlal Nehru gave India suzerainty over Kingdom of Sikkim in exchange for it retaining its independence. This continued until 1975, when the Sikkimese monarchy was abolished in favour of a merger into India. Sikkim is now one of the states of India.

Lakshadweep (Laccadives)
Located in the Arabian Sea, Lakshadweep is a Union territory of India off the coast of the southwestern state of Kerala.
The Aminidivi group of islands (Amini, Kadmat, Kiltan, Chetlat and Bitra) came under the rule of Tipu Sultan in 1787. They passed on to British control after the Third Anglo-Mysore War and were attached to the South Canara district. The rest of the islands became a suzerainty of the Arakkal Kingdom of Cannanore in return for a payment of annual tribute.

After a while, the British took over the administration of those islands for non-payment of arrears. These islands were attached to the Malabar district of the Madras Presidency. In 1956, the States Reorganisation Act separated these islands from the mainland administrative units, forming a new union territory by combining all the islands.

Pakistan

The princely states of the British India which acceded to Pakistan maintained their sovereignty with the Government of Pakistan acting as the suzerain until 1956 for Bahawalpur, Khairpur, and the Balochistan States, 1969 for Chitral and the Frontier States, and 1974 for Hunza and Nagar. All these territories have since been merged into Pakistan. These states were subject to the 'paramountcy' of the British Crown. The term was never precisely defined but it meant that the Indian states were subject to the suzerainty of the British Crown exercised through the Viceroy of India.

South African Republic
After the First Boer War (1880–81), the South African Republic was granted its independence, albeit under British suzerainty. During the Second Boer War (1899–1902), the South African Republic was annexed as the Transvaal Colony, which existed until 1910, when it became the Province of Transvaal in the Union of South Africa.

German Empire
Following the Treaty of Brest-Litovsk (1918), the German Empire received a very short-lived suzerainty over the Baltic countries of Estonia, Latvia, and Lithuania. New monarchies were created in Lithuania and the United Baltic Duchy (which comprised the modern countries of Latvia and Estonia). The German aristocrats Wilhelm Karl, Duke of Urach (in Lithuania), and Adolf Friedrich, Duke of Mecklenburg-Schwerin (in the United Baltic Duchy), were appointed as rulers. This plan was detailed by German Colonel General Erich Ludendorff, who wrote, "German prestige demands that we should hold a strong protecting hand, not only over German citizens, but over all Germans."

Second World War
Despite being occupied by the Axis powers, several Western and Asian countries were allowed to exercise self-rule. Several states were created in order to facilitate their occupation, including Vichy France, Manchukuo, the Empire of Vietnam, the Independent State of Croatia in Croatia and the Lokot Autonomy in Central Russia.

Historical suzerainties
Ottoman Empire:
 Principality of Serbia
 Principality of Samos
 Cretan State
 Crimean Khanate
 Septinsular Republic
 Principality of Bulgaria
 Principality of Moldavia
 Republic of Ragusa
 Principality of Romania
 Serbian Despotate
 Principality of Transylvania
 Principality of Upper Hungary
 Principality of Wallachia
 Khedivate of Egypt
 Vilayet of Tripolitania
 Eyalet of Tunis
 Regency of Algiers

Duchy of Prussia/Kingdom of Prussia/North German Confederation/German Empire
 Electorate of Brandenburg (Brandenburg-Prussia)
 Principality of Neuchâtel
 County of Stolberg-Wernigerode
  County of Stolberg-Schwarza (after 1748)
 County of Stolberg-Gedern (after 1804)
 Grand Duchy of Posen
 Duchy of Saxe-Lauenburg
 Grand Duchy of Baden (Franco-Prussian War)
 Kingdom of Bavaria (Franco-Prussian War)
 Kingdom of Württemberg (Franco-Prussian War)
 Grand Duchy of Hesse and by Rhine (Franco-Prussian War)
 Kingdom of Finland
 Duchy of Courland and Semigallia
 United Baltic Duchy
 Duchy of Courland and Semigallia
 Duchy of Estonia and Livonia
 Kingdom of Lithuania
 Kingdom of Poland
 Belarusian Democratic Republic
 Ukrainian People's Republic (Treaty of Brest-Litovsk)
 Ukrainian State
 Crimean Regional Government
 Don Republic
 Kuban People's Republic
 Mountainous Republic of the Northern Caucasus
 Transcaucasian Democratic Federative Republic (Otto von Lossow mission)
 Democratic Republic of Georgia (Treaty of Poti)

Qing Dynasty:
 Mongolia
 Tibet
 Korea
 Vietnam
 Myanmar
 Thailand

Empire of Japan:

Ryukyu Kingdom
Korea

In Europe:
Habsburg control, as Holy Roman Emperor, over Liechtenstein (1719–1918), previously Schellenberg (1499–1719) and County of Vaduz (1322–1719)
 Ireland, under the control of the High King of Ireland.
 Piombino (Kingdom of the Two Sicilies)

In Indonesia:
 Kingdom of Larantuka

Suzerainties in Fiction
In J.R.R. Tolkien’s The Return of the King, the Mouth of Sauron proposes terms of surrender that would effectively give Mordor suzerainty over Gondor and Rohan: “The rabble of Gondor and its deluded allies shall withdraw at once beyond the Anduin, first taking oaths never again to assail Sauron the Great in arms, open or secret. ... West of the Anduin as far as the Misty Mountains and the Gap of Rohan shall be tributary to Mordor, and men there shall bear no weapons, but shall have leave to govern their own affairs.”

In the Walking Dead comic book series and its television spinoff, Negan and the Saviors are a militant group who establish suzerainty over the various survivor communities in Northern Virginia. Under the pretense of protecting them against zombies and hostile humans, the Saviors threaten subservient communities with extreme violence unless those communities provide regular shipments of food, skilled personnel, and other supplies. The Saviors also disarm these communities but otherwise allow them to remain internally self-governing.

In Season 7 of Supernatural, Castiel briefly attains god-like powers and takes direct control of Heaven.  He then meets with the King of Hell, Crowley, to propose an arrangement in which Crowley maintains control over Hell’s internal affairs but pledges allegiance to Castiel. He also requires Crowley to give him control over the distribution of souls between Heaven and Hell, as souls are a source of supernatural power that Castiel needs to maintain his dominance. Reasoning that he has no choice, Crowley promptly agrees to this arrangement.

See also

Associated state
Client state
Finlandization
Hegemony
Imperialism
Mandala (Southeast Asian history)
Overking
Puppet state
Satellite state
Satrap
Sadae
Special Administrative Region
Tributary state
Tributary system of China
Vassal state
Westphalian sovereignty

References

Inline citations

Sources cited 

 
 
 
 
 
 
 
 
 

Types of administrative division
International law
Independence
Sovereignty